The  Duisburg Philharmonic Orchestra (in German: Duisburger Philharmoniker) is a German orchestra based in Duisburg. The orchestra was founded in 1877.

Conductors include:
 Walter Josephson (1899 to 1920)
 Paul Scheinpflug (1920 to 1928)
 Eugen Jochum (1930 to 1933)
 Otto Volkmann (1933 to 1944).

After World War II Georg Ludwig Jochum had the care of rebuilding the orchestra, followed by

 Walter Weller (1971)
 Miltiades Caridis (1975 to 1981)
 Lawrence Foster (1982 to 1987)
 Alexander Lazarev (1988 to 1993)
Bruno Weil (1994 to 2002)
Jonathan Darlington (2002 to 2011)
Giordano Bellincampi (2012 to 2017)
Axel Kober (2019 to present).

The Duisburg Philharmonic Orchestra is the accompanying orchestra of the Duisburg
Opera "Deutsche Oper am Rhein".

External links
 Official site

References

Musical groups established in 1877
Culture in Duisburg
German symphony orchestras
1877 establishments in Germany